Line 22 of the Guangzhou Metro is a partially open rapid transit express line in Guangzhou with trains operating up to . Currently, there are train attendants on board each train. In the future, trains will operate fully driverless GoA4 mode when sufficient reliability from the signaling system has been confirmed.

Summary

Phase 1
Two distinct stopping patterns will be operated, a local all stop service and an express service. In early planning, Line 22 would interline with Line 18 south of Panyu Square to Wanqingsha. This was later abandoned and Line 22 upon opening will terminate at Panyu Square but track connections between the two lines still exist.

Future Expansion 
According to the long-term plan (2029–2051), Line 22 will be expanded both to the north and south from its current termini. The average passenger flow of the line when complete is predicted to exceed one million passengers per day.

North Extension
The North extension of Line 22 will be  in length with 10 new stations and be fully underground. The north extension will directly connect Guangzhou Baiyun Airport while passing through Guangzhou Railway Station and Guangzhou Baiyun Railway Station. On December 31, 2021, the North Extension started construction.

South Extension 
In 2019, Dongguan municipal government proposed Line 22 to be extended east beyond Panyu Square to Nansha Subdistrict and cross the Shiziyang Channel into Dongguan and beyond to Shajing Town in northern Bao'an District, Shenzhen. In 2020, Guangzhou Metro began soliciting bids to further investigate the extension of Line 22 into Dongguan and Shenzhen. The first section of this extension a  segment from Panyu Square to Chang'an, Dongguan were officially included in Guangdong's 14th Five Year Plan in 2021 with provisions for future extension an connection with the Shenzhen Metro. The extension to Shenzhen will connect Qingsheng, Jiaomen, Nansha Passenger Port, cross the Pearl River Estuary and extend to Dongguan and finally connect to Shenzhen Guangmingcheng High-speed Railway Station.

Opening time

Stations
Legend
 - Opened on 31 March 2022
 - Under construction

References

22
Automated guideway transit
25 kV AC railway electrification